Marianna Yarovskaya is a Russian-American documentary filmmaker who is the director and producer of the 2018 Academy Award short-listed documentary film Women of the Gulag based on the book Women of the Gulag: Stories of Five Remarkable Lives by Paul Roderick Gregory (2013). She also produced Greedy Lying Bastards (2012).

Early life and education 
Yarovskaya is the daughter of Russian actor and director Marianna Yablonskaya and a rocket scientist, Arkady Yarovsky.

She first studied journalism at Moscow State University, before moving to California and studying film at the USC School of Cinematic Arts.

Filmography 
In 1998, Yarovskaya directed Undesirables (Student Academy Award, 2001). Her documentary film Holy Warriors, a study of soldiers who found religion, has played in 35 countries worldwide. In 2006, she was a head of research on An Inconvenient Truth which won an Academy Award for Best Documentary Feature.
She produced feature films Greedy Lying Bastards (2012) and Pussy Riot: the Movement (2013). Yarovskaya worked in the research department on Into the Arms of Strangers: Stories of the Kindertransport (2001), and on award-winning feature documentaries Countdown to Zero (2010), Samsara (2012), Spirit of the Marathon II (2013), Last Days in Vietnam (2014), Vessel (2014), Merchants of Doubt (2014), Red Army (2014), Swift Current (2016), Betting on Zero (2016), Boston (2017), Blood Road (2017), "Big Lies" (2018), "Skid Row Marathon" (2019), "Oleg" (2021), and  Selena Gomez: My Mind & Me (2022).

Since 2000, she has also worked for Discovery Channel, National Geographic, the History Channel, Greenpeace and Netflix as Producer and Senior Editor.

Yarovskaya produced Women of the Gulag with historian Paul Roderick Gregory. The film premiered at the 41st Moscow International Film Festival in 2018. The film was shortlisted for an Academy Award in the "best documentary short" category. It won festivals in Iceland, US/California, South Korea, Hong Kong, France, Canada, Croatia, and Russia. The film's Russian TV premiere took place in May 2021, but the film was censored.

Awards and recognition 

 Marianna directed and produced Undesirables, which won a Student Academy Award (Student Oscar) and a College Television Award and was screened at Cannes.
 An Inconvenient Truth won an Academy Award for Best Documentary Feature.
 She is a recipient of the National Endowment for the Humanities (NEH) Bridging Cultures Through Film grant.
 Women of the Gulag was short-listed for Academy Award Documentary Nomination in 2019.
 Yarovskaya is the first female director from Russia short-listed for the Oscars.

References

External links

 Official website

Russian emigrants to the United States
Russian film directors
Living people
1971 births
University of Southern California alumni
American documentary film directors
Mass media people from Moscow
Moscow State University alumni
21st-century American women
American women documentary filmmakers